Piney is a community in southeastern Manitoba, Canada, in the Rural Municipality of Piney. It is approximately 130 kilometers from Winnipeg and within five kilometres of the Canada–US border.

It is served by the Piney Pinecreek Border Airport, unusual in that its runway lies across the international border, along the Pinecreek–Piney Border Crossing.

Climate

Gallery

See also
Pinecreek–Piney Border Crossing

References

Unincorporated communities in Eastman Region, Manitoba